Erlangen-Höchstadt is a Landkreis (district) in Bavaria, Germany. It is bounded by (from the south and clockwise) the districts of Fürth, Neustadt (Aisch)-Bad Windsheim, Bamberg, Forchheim and Nürnberger Land, and by the cities of Nuremberg and Erlangen. The city of Erlangen is not part of the district, but nonetheless its administrative seat.

History

The earliest extant documents are drawings from 1413 which show water wheels along the Regnitz.  The first (1449–1450) and second (1552–1555) Margrave wars, Brandenburg versus Nuremberg,  devastated the countryside.

In 1715 a lock was placed in the Regnitz river at Hemhofen.  The highpoint of waterwheel usage was in the early 19th century when more than 190 were in use between Fuerth and Forchheim.

The district was established in 1972 by merging the former districts of Erlangen and Höchstadt.

Geography

The main river is the Regnitz, which runs through the city of Erlangen. Lands west of the river are covered with several hundred tiny lakes on both sides of the Aisch. The Aisch is an affluent of the Regnitz, running from southwest to east. East of the river the country is rising to the hills of the northern Frankish Alb.

Coat of arms
The coat of arms displays:
 the lion of the clerical state of Bamberg, which ruled the district's western half until 1802
 the red and white border of the right half is taken from the arms of Brandenburg-Kulmbach (see Bayreuth)
 the blue and gold colours of the right half are identical to the heraldic colours of Nuremberg
 the image in the right half symbolises a watermill on the river Regnitz

Towns and municipalities

References

External links

Official website (German)

 
Districts of Bavaria